Nebularia ferruginea is a species of sea snail, a marine gastropod mollusc in the family Mitridae, the miters or miter snails.

References

ferruginea
Gastropods described in 1811